Shaji John, professionally credited by his stage name Kalabhavan Shajohn is an Indian actor, director and comedian who works primarily in Malayalam cinema. He started his career as a mimicry artist in Kalabhavan, Kochi. Making his debut in 1999 with My Dear Karadi and having made more than 90 appearances, he received a major breakthrough in his career with Drishyam (2013), in which he played a negative role. He made his directorial debut with Brother's Day starring Prithviraj. As of June 2021, he has starred in more than 130 Malayalam films.

Personal life

He was born as Shaji John to E. J. John, a retired ASI and Rejina, a retired nurse, in Varissery, Kottayam, Kerala in India. He studied at St. Mary's College, Manarcaud He has a brother Shibu John who is also a mimicry artist and radio RJ in Voice Of Kerala.

He married Dini on 28 October 2004. The couple has a daughter, Hanna and a son, Yohan.

Awards and honours

Filmography

As actor

Playback singing

As director

References

External links
 
 Ladies and Gentleman Movie review.
 Kalabhavan Shajohn at MSI
 

Indian male film actors
Male actors from Kottayam
Living people
Male actors in Malayalam cinema
Indian impressionists (entertainers)
21st-century Indian male actors
1977 births